Colon cancer associated transcript 1 is a long non-coding RNA that, in humans, is encoded by the CCAT1 gene. 

This gene produces a long non-coding RNA that promotes tumor formation and is upregulated in colon cancer and other cancer cell types. This transcript may regulate long range chromosomal interactions, including at the Myc oncoprotein locus. This RNA may also function as a molecular sponge for microRNAs.

References

Further reading 

LncRNA